Bördeland is a municipality in the district Salzlandkreis, in Saxony-Anhalt, Germany. It is situated south-west of Schönebeck.

History
The municipality was formed on 29 December 2007 from the former municipalities Biere, Eggersdorf, Eickendorf, Großmühlingen, Kleinmühlingen, Welsleben and Zens. Between January 2005 and January 2008, these municipalities cooperated in the Verwaltungsgemeinschaft ("collective municipality") Südöstliches Bördeland.

Subdivision

References

External links

 
Salzlandkreis